The Belgrade Jazz Trio was a jazz trio founded in Belgrade, Serbia, then Yugoslavia.

Its members were Milenko Stefanović - clarinet, Vojislav Đonović - guitar and Aleksandar Nećak - bass.

External links
 Belgrade Jazz Trio at the Second Yugoslavian Jazz Festival in Bled, 1961. 

Serbian jazz ensembles
Musical trios